The Rolls-Royce Turbomeca RTM322 is a turboshaft engine produced by Safran Helicopter Engines.  It was originally conceived and manufactured by  Rolls-Royce Turbomeca Limited, a joint venture between Rolls-Royce plc and Turbomeca (now Safran Helicopter Engines). The engine was designed to suit a wide range of military and commercial helicopter designs. The RTM322 can also be employed in maritime and industrial applications.

The Safran Aneto is a later development targeted for the super-medium and heavy helicopters, developed by Safran Helicopter Engines, unveiled at London's Helitech on 3 October 2017 and covering the  range.

Development

It was designed for the Hughes AH-64 Apache and Sikorsky UH-60 Blackhawk, competing with the General Electric T700 and the Pratt & Whitney Canada PW100.
The partners shared equally the £100 million development costs, Rolls-Royce makes the turbines, the combustor, and the inlet particle separator while Turbomeca produces the axial-centrifugal compressor and intake.
It first ran on 15 December 1984, with eight bench prototypes for 30,000 cycles and 13,000 test hours, and four for flight tests, initially aiming for a 1987 certification.

The first order for the RTM322 was received in 1992 to power 44 Royal Navy AugustaWestland Merlin HM1s which subsequently entered service in 1998.
Over 1,100 engines are in service, having logged over one million flight hours, powering 60% of the AW101 fleet and 80% of in-service NH90s.

In 2013, Turbomeca (part of the Safran Group, and now known as Safran Helicopter Engines) acquired the entire programme, becoming responsible for both production and product support. Safran Helicopter Engines has since developed a new engine derived from the RTM322, known as the Aneto.

Safran Aneto

The first 2,500 shp -1K was selected to power the Leonardo AW149 and Leonardo AW189K twin to extend its capabilities, it flew in March 2017 and is scheduled to be introduced in the fourth quarter of 2018.
The more powerful 3,000+ shp “Dash 3” should appear in the early 2020s and will feature a new compressor and hot section.
The required documentation should be handled to the EASA in early 2019 for a second quarter certification.
By October 2018, the programme had accumulated 4,000 hours, including 105 hours of flight time. Sikorsky is considering re-engining its CT7-powered S-92.

The  Aneto-1K was added on the RTM 322 type certificate on 12 December 2019.

Design

As an RTM322 variant, the Aneto is a two spool turboshaft with a three stage axial compressor and a single stage centrifugal compressor turning at 36,300rpm, a reverse flow annular combustor, a two stage gas generator axial turbine and a two stage axial power turbine with a forward transmission shaft turning at 21,000rpm. Fitted with an inlet particle separator, its accessory gearbox is driven by the gas generator and the engine is control by a FADEC.

Built upon the Safran Tech 3000 technological demonstrator, it aims to gradually offer up to 15% better fuel economy over current competitors to improve payload-range and offers 25% better power density than existing engines of same volume. Offered for new or for existing models, fewer scheduled maintenance tasks, longer maintenance intervals and health monitoring should improve maintainability.

Suited for 8–15 ton helicopters, it is developed from the RTM322: the -1K has a similar architecture but no common parts. Parts made by additive manufacturing are used in the gyratory combustion chamber and the inlet guide vane system. Compatible with hybrid and distributed propulsion systems, in cruise flight one of the two engines could be shut down and restarted when needed. In the AW189, it is offered along the incumbent General Electric CT7, needing minor changes to the top-deck structure and engine cowls. Exempted from U.S. International Traffic in Arms Regulations, it could power the AW189's military derivative, the AW149 or a future attack helicopter based on its dynamic systems.

Developed from a French Aviation Authority study, the Safran Power Pack Eco Mode on the Airbus Helicopters Racer allows it to shut down one of engines in cruise, lowering fuel consumption by 15%, and quickly and automatically reactivate it with an electric starter to its maximum power for acceleration, landing or emergencies. The Aneto specific fuel consumption should be 10% better  than the competing CT7s.

Applications
AgustaWestland Apache
AgustaWestland AW101
NHIndustries NH90
 Also used in Eurocopter X3

Aneto
 Leonardo AW149
 Leonardo AW189K: Aneto-1K, 2,500 shp; March 2017 first flight, fourth quarter of 2018 introduction.
 Proposed for the Airbus Helicopters X6 (suspended)
 Airbus Helicopters Racer high-speed demonstrator: Aneto-1X, 2,500 shp.

Specifications

See also

References

External links

 Rolls-Royce RTM322 page
 Turbomeca RTM 322 page
 

1990s turboshaft engines
Rolls-Royce aircraft gas turbine engines
Turbomeca aircraft engines
Mixed-compressor gas turbines
2010s turboshaft engines